Throughout film, television, and radio, British comedy has become known for its consistently peculiar characters, plots, and settings, and has produced some of the most renowned comedians and characters in the world.

History

British comedy history is measured in centuries. Shakespeare incorporated many chase scenes and beatings into his comedies, such as in his play The Comedy of Errors. The quarrelsome couple Punch and Judy made their first recorded appearance in Britain in 1662, when Samuel Pepys noted a "pretty" puppet play being performed in Covent Garden, London. The various episodes of Punch and Judy are performed in the spirit of outrageous comedy — often provoking shocked laughter — and are dominated by the anarchic clowning of Mr. Punch.

Satire has been a major feature of comedy in the British isles for centuries. The pictorial satire of William Hogarth was a precursor to the development of political cartoons in 18th century England. The medium developed under the direction of its greatest exponent, James Gillray from London, who has been referred to as the father of the political cartoon. With his satirical works calling the king (George III), prime ministers and generals (especially Napoleon) to account, Gillray's wit and keen sense of the ridiculous made him the pre-eminent cartoonist of the era.

In early 19th century England, pantomime acquired its present form which includes slapstick comedy and featured the first mainstream clown Joseph Grimaldi, while comedy routines also featured heavily in British music hall theatre which became popular in the 1850s. British comedians who honed their skills at pantomime and music hall sketches include Charlie Chaplin, Stan Laurel, George Formby and Dan Leno. The influential English music hall comedian and theatre impresario Fred Karno developed a form of sketch comedy without dialogue in the 1890s, and Chaplin and Laurel were among the young comedians who worked for him as part of "Fred Karno's Army".

Film comedy
See British comedy films (Cinema of the United Kingdom).

Radio
Radio comedy in Britain has been almost exclusively the preserve of the BBC, and a number of British radio comedies achieved considerable renown in the second half of the 20th century.

In the 1940s and 1950s, variety dominated the schedules, and popular series included It's That Man Again and Much Binding in the Marsh. In the mid-1950s, however, two notable series emerged which would help to shape the future of radio and television comedy in Britain. The Goons (Peter Sellers, Spike Milligan and Harry Secombe) starred in their own anarchic series The Goon Show which ran throughout the 1950s. At the same time, the BBC was also running Hancock's Half Hour starring Tony Hancock, the first of a new generation of comedies based on believable characters and situations. Hancock's Half Hour later transferred to TV and was phenomenally successful throughout the 1950s, running concurrently on radio and television until 1960.

Another notable radio show was the double entendre-laden Round the Horne (1965–1968), a sequel to the earlier series Beyond Our Ken, which ran from 1959 to 1964. I'm Sorry, I'll Read That Again (1964-1973) gained a devoted youth following in the late 1960s.

Later radio shows made use of the panel game format, including the long-running Just a Minute (1967–), I'm Sorry I Haven't a Clue (1972–) and The News Quiz (1977–), which often broadcast a dozen of so episodes a year, normally split over two series broadcast at different points in the year.  The success of the panel show format has in turn has influenced TV series like Have I Got News for You (1990–), They Think It's All Over (1995–2006) and Mock the Week (2005–).

BBC Radio has continued to be a breeding ground for new talent and many programmes have transferred successfully to television, including Whose Line is it Anyway?, On the Hour, Goodness Gracious Me, Knowing Me, Knowing You and Little Britain.

Television
Although many popular shows of recent years began life on BBC Radio, there have been many successful and influential series which were designed purely for TV.  In contrast to their US counterparts, which have seasons of up to 26 episodes a year, British sit-coms traditionally have series of just 6 episodes.  The main reason for this is that British shows are generally written by one or two dedicated writers - often the people that created the show in the first place - as opposed to the US model of having a larger writing team.  In part, this is a reflection of the difference between the size of the TV audience in the two countries, and the economics of television production; for decades sit-coms were the shows on US television that delivered the highest ratings; in Britain the highest ratings figures were normally for soap operas, which generally run several times a week, year-in year-out, and as a result generally required larger writing teams.

Following the success of Hancock's Half Hour and Steptoe and Son, the sitcom became firmly entrenched in the television schedules. Some of the most successful examples include Dad's Army, Absolutely Fabulous, and Red Dwarf.

The BBC has generally been dominant in television comedy, but the commercial stations have also had some successes. ITV's most successful sitcoms were generally produced in the 1970s, including Rising Damp, On the Buses, and George and Mildred. Commercial station Channel 4 has been more successful than ITV with situation comedies in recent years. Some of the better-known examples are Drop the Dead Donkey, Spaced, Green Wing, and The Inbetweeners.

Other formats have also been popular, with sketch shows, stand-up comedy, impressionists and even puppet shows finding success. Although impressionists experienced a lull in popularity in the 1990s, the success of Dead Ringers (another BBC Radio cross-over) and Alistair McGowan's Big Impression has been notable.

The most notable satirical comedies are the ground-breaking 1960s series That Was The Week That Was, 1980s series Not the Nine O'Clock News, and ITV's puppet show Spitting Image. One of the most-watched shows of the 1980s and early 1990s, Spitting Image was a satire of politics, entertainment, sport and British culture of the era, and at its peak it was watched by 15 million people. British satire has also washed over into quiz shows – popular examples include the news quiz Have I Got News for You, Mock the Week, 8 out of 10 cats, Shooting Stars and music-based Never Mind The Buzzcocks.

One of the most influential groups in comedy is Monty Python. Their Flying Circus sketch show aired on the BBC between 1969 and 1974. The group itself consisted of six members, Graham Chapman, John Cleese, Terry Gilliam, Eric Idle, Terry Jones and Michael Palin. All were UK-born except Gilliam, who was US-born. Chapman, Cleese, and Idle attended the University of Cambridge, while Jones and Palin attended the University of Oxford. Gilliam was an alumnus of Occidental College. The Pythons went on to produce a large body of other legendary work including two TV specials for Germany, four feature films, a concert film, and various documentary specials detailing the group's history. Their unique brand of humour has had a profound influence on British comedy and on comedy in general. They themselves had been influenced by The Goons and Spike Milligan's Q series. Python found surprising popularity in the US in the 1970s, as did the less cerebral humour of Benny Hill and his ITV sketch series The Benny Hill Show.

Other notable sketch-based series include Morecambe and Wise, The Two Ronnies, The Goodies, French and Saunders, The Catherine Tate Show, and The Fast Show.

In the 1980s, alternative comedy was spearheaded by Ben Elton and The Comic Strip group which included Alexei Sayle, Rik Mayall, and French and Saunders.

Vic Reeves Big Night Out influenced the style of a whole new generation of comics in the 1990s until the present day.

The 1990s and 2000s also saw the rise of a new set of British comedians who made innovative contributions mainly in the form of sitcoms. Shows such as Mr. Bean, Green Wing, Peep Show, Black Books, Teachers, Spaced, Smack the Pony, Big Train, The Office, and Extras have used editing, surreal humour, and cultural references to great effect. A loose clique of stars, including Simon Pegg, Dylan Moran, Jessica Stevenson, Mark Heap, Tamsin Greig, Bill Bailey have revolved around these series.

See also
 British Comedy Guide
 List of British comedians
 British Comedy Awards
 British humour
 British sitcom
 List of U.K. game shows
 List of BBC sitcoms

References

Further reading

 
British humour
British culture